Philemon Cascas Angula (born 20 August 1974) is a retired Namibian footballer. He was capped twice and scored once for the Namibia national football team, including a squad membership without actually playing at the 1998 African Cup of Nations. He mostly played for Oshakati City, except for the years 2004 to 2006 when he played for Civics FC, picking up two league titles. He has later coached Ongwediva City.

References

1974 births
Living people
Namibian men's footballers
F.C. Civics Windhoek players
Namibia Premier League players
Namibia international footballers
1998 African Cup of Nations players
Namibian football managers
Association football forwards